Bullet Time is a BBC Books original novel written by David A. McIntee and based on the long-running British science fiction television series Doctor Who. It features the Seventh Doctor and Sarah Jane Smith.

Plot
Sarah Jane Smith encounters the Seventh Doctor in Hong Kong.

Continuity
 A line removed from the final novel would have explained that the Tzun cloned the Master during McIntee's's novel First Frontier, explaining the contradictory stories featuring the Master set after Survival.
Sarah's meeting with the Seventh Doctor seems to contradict the 2006 series episode "School Reunion", written some years later, where she claimed she had not seen the Doctor for decades. However, the ending of this novel also implies that Sarah was killed in 1997. This was part of a larger story arc involving a group known as the Council of Eight who were attempting to eliminate the Doctor and his companions from the timeline. When the Council were defeated in Sometime Never..., some of their actions were reversed, so to what extent the events of this novel were left intact within the continuity of the Eighth Doctor Adventures is unclear.

References

2001 British novels
2001 science fiction novels
Past Doctor Adventures
Seventh Doctor novels
Novels by David A. McIntee
BBC Books books
Novels set in Hong Kong